The Toyota Ladies Open was a women's professional golf tournament on the Swedish Golf Tour played annually from 1996 until 2000. It was always held at the Bokskogen Golf Club in Svedala, Sweden.

Winners

References

Swedish Golf Tour (women) events
Golf tournaments in Sweden
Defunct sports competitions in Sweden
Recurring sporting events established in 1996
Recurring sporting events disestablished in 2000